Sir Timothy Charles Clark  (born 22 November 1949) is a British business executive and the incumbent President of Dubai based Airline Emirates since January 2003. He was also the Managing Director of SriLankan Airlines until 2008. Sir Timothy is an economics graduate from the University of London. He attended Kent College Canterbury and is a fellow of the Royal Aeronautical Society.

Life and works
Clark has been in the civil aviation business since 1972 when he joined British Caledonian. In 1975, he moved to Gulf Air in Bahrain and subsequently to Dubai in 1985 where he became a member of the founding team of Emirates as Head of Airline Planning. He is currently the President of Emirates. He was also Managing Director of SriLankan Airlines until 2008. The latter post resulted from the acquisition of a 40% stake in SriLankan Airlines by Emirates in April 1998. However, that post was lost when the Sri Lankan government took control of the airline and Emirates never renewed their contract for management of the airline.

Clark became President of Emirates in 2003 after spending 18 years helping build an aviation empire, which owes much of its success to the route network he established after joining as Head of Airline Planning.

In addition, Clark is the Chairman of the Emirates Airline Foundation, a non-profit charity that he helped found which provides humanitarian philanthropic aid and services for children in need around the world.

Clark was appointed Knight Commander of the Order of the British Empire (KBE) in the 2014 New Year Honours for services to British prosperity and to the aviation industry.

Aviation Week & Space Technology magazine named Clark its 2013 Person of the Year.

In December 2019, Clark announced that he would be stepping down from his role as President of Emirates, but subsequently delayed his retirement due to the Covid-19 pandemic.

On 18 April 2022, in an interview with the BBC, when asked if he would reconsider Emirates's decision to continue flying to and from Russia, Clark stated the decision to cease operations to and from Russia is one for the United Arab Emirates government to take as Emirates' owner is the UAE government.

See also 
 The Emirates Group

References

1949 births
Living people
Emirates (airline)
Alumni of the University of London
English emigrants to the United Arab Emirates
British airline chief executives
Knights Commander of the Order of the British Empire
People educated at Kent College